Hyehwa-dong is a dong (neighborhood) of Jongno-gu in Seoul, South Korea. It is adjacent to the Seoul National University Hospital.

Attractions
 PMC Daehangno Jayu Theater - musical Polaroid were played from 3 to 24 August 2008, starring Andy of Shinhwa and former Miss Korea Honey Lee.

Education

Lycée International Xavier was located in this dong. It moved to Gugi-dong in May 2005.

 Lycée International Xavier
 Sungkyunkwan University

See also 
Administrative divisions of South Korea

References

External links
 Jongno-gu Official site in English
 Jongno-gu Official site
 Status quo of Jongno-gu by administrative dong 
 Hyehwa-dong Resident office 
 Origin of Hyehwa-dong name

Neighbourhoods of Jongno-gu